Campylonotoidea is a superfamily of shrimp, containing the two families Campylonotidae and Bathypalaemonellidae. Fenner A. Chace considered it to be the sister group to the much larger superfamily Palaemonoidea, with which it shares the absence of endopods on the pereiopods, and the fact that the first pereiopod is thinner than the second. Using molecular phylogenetics, Bracken et al. proposed that Campylonotoidea may be closer to Atyoidea. There are sixteen described species in 3 genera; no fossils are known.

Campylonotidae Sollaud, 1913
Campylonotus Bate, 1888
Bathypalaemonellidae de Saint Laurent, 1985
Bathypalaemonella Balss, 1914
Bathypalaemonetes Cleva, 2001

References

Caridea
Arthropod superfamilies